The 2013–14 Kansas Jayhawks women's basketball team represented the University of Kansas in the 2013–14 NCAA Division I women's basketball season. It was head coach Bonnie Henrickson's tenth season at Kansas.  Home games were played at Allen Fieldhouse in Lawrence. They finished the season with a record of 13–19 overall, and their Big 12 Conference record was 5–13 for a tie to finish in eighth place. They lost in the quarterfinals in the 2014 Big 12 women's basketball tournament to Baylor.

Roster

Schedule and results 
Sources:

|-
!colspan=9 style="background:#E8000D; color:#0022B4;"| Exhibition

|-
!colspan=9 style="background:#0022B4; color:#E8000D;"| Non-Conference Games

|-
!colspan=9 style="background:#E8000D; color:#0022B4;"| Big 12 tournament

x- All JTV games will air on Metro Sports, ESPN3 and local affiliates.

See also 
 2013–14 Kansas Jayhawks men's basketball team

References 

Kansas Jayhawks women's basketball seasons
Kansas
2013 in sports in Kansas
2014 in sports in Kansas